Sar Sardab may refer to:
 Sar Sardab-e Olya
 Sar Sardab-e Sofla